The 1956–57 Iraq Central FA First Division Cup was the ninth season of the Iraq Central FA League (the top division of football in Baghdad and its neighbouring cities from 1948 to 1973) and the first season under the name of Iraq Central FA First Division Cup. Six teams competed in the tournament, which started on 18 December 1956.

It was played as a double-elimination tournament, with Maslahat Naqil Al-Rukab winning their first title by beating Al-Quwa Al-Jawiya Al-Malakiya 1–0 in the final.

Final positions

Note: Al-Adhamiya and Al-Hawat dropped out of the tournament. Al-Adhamiya returned for the following season.

First round

Second round

Winners bracket

Losers bracket
Al-Ghazl wal-Naseej eliminated (results not available)

Al-Numan eliminated (results not available)

Semi-finals

Winners bracket

Losers bracket

Al-Athori eliminated

Montakhab Al-Shorta eliminated

Final

References

External links
 Iraqi Football Website

Iraq Central FA League seasons
Iraq
1956 in Iraqi sport
1957 in Iraqi sport